Winterbourne Boys' Academy (formerly Winterbourne Junior Boys' School) is a junior school in the London Borough of Croydon for boys aged between 7 and 11 years. Along with its sister Girls' School, the schools are the last remaining single-sex, state-funded junior schools in the UK.

General information 
The school is on Winterbourne Road in Thornton Heath. The Local Education Authority for the school is the London Borough of Croydon, however the school converted to academy status in April 2014. The school caters for pupils from Year 3 to Year 6. The uniform of the school is a grey jumper with the school logo, white shirt and grey  or black trousers (a sweatshirt with the school logo is also available, as is a fleece jacket).  There are approximately 250 pupils on roll (as of February 2011) with a maximum of 30 pupils in each of 8 classes (2 classes per year group). From September 2007, there has been an additional class in the morning sessions: from September until April (when the Year 6 SATs take place) this consists of some pupils from each of the two Year 6 classes, and from April until July this consists of some pupils from each of the two Year 5 classes.

History 
The school was opened in 1906 as a combined Boys, Girls and Infants school on 27 August 1906, but became three separate schools on 6 January 1907. It was originally called Winterbourne Road School.

The following information is based on the publication printed for the school's centenary "Winterbourne Times 1907-2007" 

At the turn of the 20th century, it was decided that a school was needed in the locality, as the nearest school was Ecclesbourne. The Board of Education in Whitehall purchased land in Winterbourne Road, and initially decided to call the school "Winterbourne Road Board School". The new school (with three departments: Boys, Girls, Infants) would cater for 1200 pupils.

At first, owing to the large numbers awaiting admission to the school, one department was opened in August 1906 as a temporary mixed school with accommodation for 540 with two classes of 50 pupils in the school hall.

In January 1907, the school was finally completed as follows:

 Boys Department:Accommodation for 408 PupilsHeadmaster: Mr. J. Potter
 Girls Department:Accommodation for 408 pupilsHeadmistress: Miss J.E. Cash
 Infants Department:Accommodation for 444 pupilsHeadmistress: Mrs G.L. Fowles

War memorial 

There was a war memorial in the building commemorating two former Masters and 50 old boys. The first pupils of the school were just of an age to serve in World War I. Although the memorial itself is now lost, the inscription is known (links are to known entries at the Commonwealth War Graves Commission website):

Centenary celebrations 

In the summer of 2007, the schools on the site joined in celebrations to mark the centenary of the schools' opening. This culminated in the unveiling of a plaque by the Mayor of Croydon in front of the pupils of all three schools, followed by the mass release of balloons.

Conversion to an academy 
A consultation was held (ending in Spring 2014) about the conversion of the school to an academy with Platanos Trust. The conversion to an academy occurred 1 April 2014, in line with the date proposed for this conversion by the Department for Education. The was later renamed Winterbourne Boys' Academy.

Headteachers 

The headteachers of the boys' school have been:

References

External links
Official Website
Performance Tables
The school's official description of itself
Croydon local studies library where many of the school's documents from 1906 to present are now held

Primary schools in the London Borough of Croydon
Educational institutions established in 1907
1907 establishments in England
Academies in the London Borough of Croydon
Thornton Heath